The Crescent City Classic is an annual 10-kilometer race held in New Orleans, Louisiana, United States. Mac DeVaughn founded the Classic and held the first race in 1979. The race was originally held in the Fall, but the race is now held the Saturday before Easter.

Course
The current course is a point to point course that starts downtown in the Central Business District by the Superdome, following city streets (Poydras Street, Peters Street, Decatur Street, Esplanade Avenue, City Park Avenue) and into City Park, where the official finish line is located on Lelong Ave. just before the New Orleans Museum of Art.

Past winners
Key:

Source:

Wins by country

Festival
A concurrent festival begins as the first runners pass the finish line. The festival which includes a concert, food and beverages is held in City Park.

See also
Crescent City Fall Classic

References

External links 
Official site

10K runs
Road running competitions in the United States
Road Running